Pason is a surname. Notable people with the surname include:

 Greg Pason (born 1966), American political candidate and activist

See also
 Jason (surname)
 Passon
 Paton (surname)
 Paxson (surname)